Xhendelesse is a Belgian village an district of the city of Herve, Wallonia, in the province of Liège.

Herve
Former municipalities of Liège Province